Governor Maxwell may refer to:

James Maxwell (colonial administrator) (1869–1932), Governor of Northern Rhodesia from 1927 to 1932
John Maxwell (British Army officer) (1859–1929), Governor of Nubia in 1897, Governor of Omdurman in 1898, Governor of Pretoria and the Western Transvaal from 1900 to 1902
John Robert Maxwell (fl. 1780s), Irish politician and Royal Governor of the Bahama Islands, 1783/4
William Edward Maxwell (1846–1897), Governor of the Gold Coast from 1895 to 1897